The 1928 United States presidential election in Maryland took place on November 6, 1928 as part of the 1928 United States presidential election. Voters chose eight representatives, or electors to the Electoral College, who voted for president and vice president.

Herbert Hoover would win Maryland by a margin of 14.73 percent against Al Smith. Hoover won all eight of the state's electoral votes as a result. Despite Hoover's landslide win, Maryland voted 2.68% more Democratic than the nation at-large. Hoover became the first ever Republican victor in Wicomico and Worcester counties. Maryland would not vote Republican again until 1948.

Results

Results by county

Counties that flipped from Republican to Democratic
Anne Arundel
Baltimore (County)
Caroline
Harford
Howard
Kent
Montgomery
Talbot
Wicomico
Worcester

See also
 United States presidential elections in Maryland
 1928 United States presidential election
 1928 United States elections

Notes

References 

Maryland
1928
Presidential